Healthy Cravings is a Philippine television cooking show broadcast by Q. Hosted by Iza Calzado and Jeremy Favia, it premiered in 2010. The show concluded in February 2011.

References
Healthy Cravings Teaser
Healthy Cravings wmn.ph
Healthy Cravings Episode
Iza Calzado and Chef. Jery Favia host Q Channel 11 Healthy Cravings www.pep.ph
A Guide To Healthy Eating www.philstar.com

2010 Philippine television series debuts
2011 Philippine television series endings
Filipino-language television shows
Philippine cooking television series
Q (TV network) original programming